

The SNCAC NC.860 (also known as the Aérocentre NC.860) was a French twin-engined development of the NC.853 light aircraft.

Development
The NC.860 was developed from the earlier NC.853 single-engined high-wing monoplane, major changes included a four-seat cabin and the fitting of two  Walter Minor 4-III engines on a re-designed wing. With the engines mounted on the high-wing the wing span was increased and the NC.860 had a tricycle landing gear.

The NC.860, registered F-WFKJ, first flew 28 March 1949.

Specification

References

Notes

Bibliography

External links
AviaFrance S.N.C.A.C. NC-860 (including image)

1940s French civil utility aircraft
086
High-wing aircraft
Aircraft first flown in 1949